Mennonite Heritage Village is a museum in Steinbach, Manitoba, Canada telling the story of the Russian Mennonites in Canada.  The museum contains both an open-air museum open seasonally, and indoor galleries open year-round. Opened in 1967 and expanded significantly since then, the Mennonite Heritage Village is a major tourist attraction in the area and officially designated as a Manitoba Signature Museum and Star Attraction. Approximately 47,000 visitors visit the museum each year.

History
The impetus for the museum began in the early 1960s after the destruction of a number of historic buildings in the area. Retired teacher John C. Reimer began to collect artifacts and established the Reimer Store museum on Main Street in Steinbach, a building that was later moved to the current museum. A committee was established in 1964 and the museum, originally called Mennonite Village Museum was opened to the public in 1967. The museum changed its name to Mennonite Heritage Village in 1987. A major expansion of the indoor galleries was completed in 1990.

Collections and galleries

The village features a large collection of original Mennonite architecture, including housebarns, churches, schools, stores, a sod hut (or semlin) and other buildings, some of which date back to the 1800s. Including the village and indoor galleries, the museum's collection contains more than 16,000 artifacts. The indoor facility documents the history of Mennonites from their origins in the Netherlands and Switzerland and focuses on the Plautdietsch-speaking Russian Mennonites who came to Western Canada. The permanent collection includes images, videos, and numerous historic artifacts, including those connected to Klaas Reimer and other important Anabaptist figures. Temporary exhibits, also open year-round, are held in the Gerhard Enns Gallery. The museum collection also includes antique tractor and transportation buildings.

The museum is famous for its Dutch windmill, a replica of the original windmill built in Steinbach in the 1880s. The first replica was burned down by arsonists in 2000, but was later rebuilt. The outdoor village also displays a section of the Berlin Wall, the original sawmill used by Mennonite Conscientious Objectors during their Alternative Service in World War II, and two important monuments originally erected in Ukraine to commemorate the centennial of Chortitza and honour the two Mennonite leaders, Jacob Hoeppner and Johann Bartsch, who chose the site and accompanied the first colonists. 

In 2018, a statue of Anabaptist martyr Dirk Willems by sculptor Peter Sawatzky was unveiled on the grounds of the museum.

The museum holds numerous special events and festivals, including the Pioneer Days festival each August and Fall on the Farm each Labour Day. The museum also has a restaurant that serves Russian Mennonite food (open seasonally) and a bookstore and gift shop (open year-round).

Affiliations
The Museum is affiliated with the Canadian Museums Association, the Canadian Heritage Information Network and Virtual Museum of Canada.

Gallery

See also
 Threshing stone
 Open-air museum
 East Reserve
 Mennonites

References

External links 
Mennonite Heritage Village

History museums in Manitoba
Mennonitism in Manitoba
Open-air museums in Canada
Rural history museums in Canada
Steinbach, Manitoba
Mennonite museums
1967 establishments in Manitoba
Museums established in 1967
Russian Mennonite diaspora in Canada